Juncus tenageia, called the sand rush, is a species of flowering plant in the genus Juncus, native to northwestern Africa, many of the Mediterranean islands, warmer parts of southern, central and eastern Europe, and western Asia including Turkey, the Caucasus region, and Kazakhstan. It is typically found growing in wet, nutrient-poor rock, sand or clay-based soils, often in clay pits, old brickyards, and on the edges of roads.

Subtaxa
The following subspecies are currently accepted:
Juncus tenageia subsp. perpusillus Fern.-Carv. & F.Navarro – A dwarfed version found in Morocco and the Iberian Peninsula
Juncus tenageia subsp. tenageia

References

tenageia
Plants described in 1781